Pavel Vasilyevich Annenkov (July 1, 1813 – March 20, 1887) was a significant Russian Empire literary critic and memoirist.

Biography
Annenkov was born into a wealthy landowning family in Moscow. He attended the philological faculty of St Petersburg University. In the late 1830s he met Vissarion Belinsky, Alexander Herzen, Mikhail Bakunin and Ivan Turgenev, with whom he became lifelong friends. In the 1840s he went abroad and formed a close relationship with Nikolai Gogol. 

His letters from Europe appeared in the journal Notes of the Fatherland. A second series of letters from Paris were published in The Contemporary in 1847/48. Annenkov was a correspondent of Karl Marx.  He edited the first major scholarly edition of Pushkin's works in 1855. His critical articles were published in various popular journals throughout the 1850s and 1860s. He was an important proponent of aestheticism along with his friend and fellow critic Alexander Druzhinin and with Vasily Botkin.

He is best known now for his memoirs The Extraordinary Decade (1880), the title of which has become attached to the Russian literary generation coming up in the 1830s and 1840s. During the 1880 Pushkin celebrations, he was given an honorary doctorate from Moscow University. He died in Dresden in 1887.

Notes

English Translations
The Extraordinary Decade: Literary Memoirs, University of Michigan Press, Ann Arbor, 1968.

References

1814 births
1887 deaths
Literary critics from the Russian Empire
Memoirists from the Russian Empire
Writers from Moscow
Pavel